The Arlau is a 37-kilometre-long river in the county of Nordfriesland in Schleswig-Holstein, Germany. It flows into the North Sea near Nordstrand and is part of the Eider catchment.

Course 
The Arlau rises southeast of Sollwitt in North Frisia. It divides the Goesharde region into North and South Goesharde. Initially it flows a few kilometres south and runs along the municipal boundary of Behrendorf and Bondelum. About 3 km southeast of Behrendorf it changes course and heads in a westerly direction. The Arlau then flows south of Viöl and north of Arlewatt, crosses the Hattstedt Marsh and finally flows into the North Sea at the Beltringharder Koog at the Holm Sluice.

Tributaries 
The Arlau is fed by the:
 Gramsholmer Bek,
 Imme,
 Eckstockau,
 Ahrenhöfter Graben,
 Ostenau,
 Bredstedter Bach,
 Jelstrom,
 Grenzau.

See also
List of rivers of Schleswig-Holstein

External links 

Rivers of Schleswig-Holstein
0Arlau
Rivers of Germany